Jamhuri is a Swahili word meaning Republic. It may refer to the following articles:

 Jamhuri Day, a Kenyan national holiday celebrated in December
 Jamhuri News, a Kenyan news curating media serving the Kenyan Diaspora since 2016 
 Jamhuri Jazz Band, a band founded in late the 1950s in Tanga, Tanzania
 Jamhuri Stadium (Morogoro), a stadium in Morogoro, Tanzania, home to Moro United football club
 Jamhuri Stadium (Dodoma), a stadium in Dodoma, Tanzania, home to JKT Ruvu Stars and Polisi Dodoma football clubs
 Jamhuri FC, an association football club from Zanzibar based in Pemba Island

Jamhuri may also refer to:
 Kenya, officially called Jamhuri ya Kenya.
 Tanzania, officially Jamhuri ya Muungano wa Tanzania.

See also
Jumhuriya (disambiguation)

Swahili words and phrases